Eucalyptus taurina, commonly known as the Helidon ironbark, is a species of medium-sized to tall ironbark that is endemic to Queensland. It has rough ironbark on the trunk and sometimes the larger branches, smooth bark above, lance-shaped adult leaves, flower buds in groups of seven, white flowers and conical to hemispherical fruit.

Description
It has rough, dark grey to black ironbark on the trunk, sometimes also the larger branches, and smooth bark above. Flowering has been observed in October and November and the flowers are white.

Taxonomy and naming
Eucalyptus taurina was first described in 1994 by Anthony Bean and Ian Brooker in the journal Austrobaileya from specimens they collected near Helidon in 1990. The specific epithet (taurina) is from the Latin word taurinus meaning "of bulls", an allusion to the author's experience when first seeing this species.

Distribution
The Helidon ironbark is found in two separate areas, one north of Helidon and the other near Crows Nest. It grows with other eucalypt species on ridges in shallow soil.

See also
List of Eucalyptus species

References

Trees of Australia
taurina
Myrtales of Australia
Flora of Queensland
Taxa named by Ian Brooker
Plants described in 1994